Battle of the Sexes is a 2017 biographical sports film directed by Valerie Faris and Jonathan Dayton and written by Simon Beaufoy. The plot is loosely based on the 1973 tennis match between Billie Jean King and Bobby Riggs. The film stars Emma Stone and Steve Carell as King and Riggs, leading an ensemble cast including Andrea Riseborough, Elisabeth Shue, Austin Stowell, Bill Pullman, Natalie Morales, Eric Christian Olsen, and Sarah Silverman in supporting roles. The film marks the second collaboration between Carell and Stone after Crazy, Stupid, Love and the second collaboration between Riseborough and Stone after Birdman.

The film had its premiere at the 44th Telluride Film Festival on September 2, 2017, and was theatrically released in the United States by Fox Searchlight Pictures on September 22, 2017. It received positive reviews from critics, who praised the performances of Stone and Carell and the direction, with some calling it the best performance of Stone's career. Despite the positive reviews, the picture was a box office bomb, grossing $18.6 million against a $25 million budget.

At the 75th Golden Globe Awards, Stone and Carell received nominations for Best Actress – Motion Picture Musical or Comedy and Best Actor – Motion Picture Musical or Comedy respectively. Both received Critics Choice Awards nominations in the categories Best Actress in a Comedy and Best Actor in a Comedy. At the 24th Screen Actors Guild Awards, Carell received a nomination for Outstanding Performance by a Male Actor in a Supporting Role.

Plot
In 1970, Billie Jean King and Gladys Heldman confront Jack Kramer, who has organized a tennis tournament where the top prize for women is one-eighth of the men's prize, despite equal ticket sales. King and Heldman threaten to start their own tour but Kramer won't alter the terms, citing the inferiority of women's tennis. When Billie Jean, Julie Heldman, Valerie Ziegenfuss, Judy Dalton, Kristy Pigeon, Peaches Bartkowicz, Kerry Melville Reid, Nancy Richey, and Rosie Casals sign on as the “Original 9” players of what becomes the WTA Tour, Kramer bans them from tournaments organized by the US Lawn Tennis Association.

While the women's tour struggles during its early days, Billie Jean begins an affair with Marilyn Barnett, her hairdresser, threatening her marriage to Larry King. Meanwhile, Bobby Riggs' marriage to the wealthy Priscilla Whelan is in trouble because of his addiction to gambling. Thrown out of his house when he can't conceal a Rolls-Royce he won in a tennis bet, he hits upon the idea of a challenge match against the top woman player, boasting that even at age 55 he can beat any woman.

The women's tour has slowly gained a stronger foothold, with the Women's Tennis Association formed in 1973. Riggs continues to pressure King to play him. Eventually, Riggs persuades Margaret Court, who recently overtook King to gain the World No. 1 ranking, to play a match in May 1973. Riggs easily defeats Court and King decides she has to accept his challenge, but demands a final say as to the arrangements. King trains intensely, while Riggs relaxes. King objects to Kramer as a game announcer, threatening to not play unless he withdraws, which he does. After a slow start, King wins the match, changing the future of women's tennis. The film ends with a written epilogue that King eventually divorced her husband and had a long-term same-sex relationship while Riggs reunited with his wife.

Cast 

 Emma Stone as Billie Jean King
 Steve Carell as Bobby Riggs
 Andrea Riseborough as Marilyn Barnett
 Sarah Silverman as Gladys Heldman
 Bill Pullman as Jack Kramer
 Alan Cumming as Cuthbert "Ted" Tinling
 Elisabeth Shue as Priscilla Riggs
 Austin Stowell as Larry King
 Natalie Morales as Rosie Casals (“Original 9”)
 Jessica McNamee as Margaret Court
 Fred Armisen as Rheo Blair
 Lewis Pullman as Larry Riggs
 Martha MacIsaac as Jane “Peaches” Bartkowicz (“Original 9”)
 Mickey Sumner as Valerie Ziegenfuss (“Original 9”)
 Bridey Elliott as Julie Heldman (“Original 9”)
 Eric Christian Olsen as Lornie Kuhle
 Wallace Langham as Henry
 Matt Malloy as Rigg's Therapist
 Dan Bakkedahl as Gamblers Anon Leader
 Chris Parnell as DJ
 Bob Stephenson as PR Sugar Daddy
 John C. McGinley as Bobby’s friend

 James Mackay as Barry Court
 Lauren Kline as Nancy Richey (“Original 9”)
 Ashley Weinhold as Kristy Pigeon (“Original 9”)
 Fidan Manashirova as Judy Tegart Dalton (“Original 9”)
 Kaitlyn Christian as Kerry Melville Reid (“Original 9”)
 Mike Vogel as Nightclub Dancer 
 Tom Kenny as Bob Sanders

Production 
The project and its two leads were announced in April 2015. Brie Larson was, for a brief period, set to replace Stone due to scheduling conflicts, but these were cleared up. On March 3, 2016, Andrea Riseborough was cast to play Marilyn Barnett, King's hairdresser and lover. Later that month, three more were cast in the film, Elisabeth Shue as Riggs' wife; Austin Stowell as Larry King, Billie Jean's husband; and Sarah Silverman as Gladys Heldman, the founder of World Tennis magazine. Four actors joined the cast in April: Eric Christian Olsen as Lornie Kuhle, Jessica McNamee as tennis player Margaret Court, Alan Cumming as designer Ted Tinling, and Natalie Morales as player Rosie Casals.

Principal photography on the film began in Los Angeles on April 13, 2016, with a budget of more than $25 million.

For the tennis match scenes, tennis players Kaitlyn Christian (who portrays “Original 9” member Kerry Melville Reid) and Vince Spadea were the body doubles of Stone and Carell, respectively.

Release
Battle of the Sexes had its world premiere at the Telluride Film Festival on September 2, 2017. It also screened at the Toronto International Film Festival on September 10, 2017, and at the BFI London Film Festival on October 7, 2017. The film began a limited release in the United States on September 22, 2017, before going wide the following week.

Reception

Box office
Battle of the Sexes grossed $12.6 million in the United States and Canada, and $5.8 million in other territories, for a worldwide total of $18.4 million.

In its opening weekend, the film grossed $515,450 from 21 theaters, an average of $24,545 per theater. The film expanded the following Friday, where it was released alongside the openings of Flatliners, 'Til Death Do Us Part and American Made, and was projected to gross around $6 million from 1,213 theaters over the weekend. It ended up making $3.4 million over the weekend, finishing 6th at the box office. Deadline Hollywood noted the film's weekend gross was disappointing given its cast and positive reviews. The following week the film was added to another 609 theaters and made $2.4 million, dropping just 30%.

Critical response
On the review aggregation website Rotten Tomatoes, the film has an approval rating of 85% based on 307 reviews, with an average rating of 7.19/10. The site's critical consensus reads, "Battle of the Sexes turns real-life events into a crowd-pleasing, well-acted dramedy that ably entertains while smartly serving up a volley of present-day parallels." On Metacritic, which assigns a normalized rating to reviews, the film a weighted average score of 73 out of 100, based on 46 critics, indicating "generally favorable reviews".

Audiences polled by CinemaScore gave the film an average grade of "A" on an A+ to F scale,<ref name=deadline>{{cite web|url=https://deadline.com/2017/09/victoria-and-abdul-stronger-battle-of-the-sexes-specialty-box-office-1202175803/|title=Victoria And Abdul' Reigns With Top PTA; 'Stronger' & 'Battle Of The Sexes' Solid – Specialty Box Office|first=Brian|last=Brooks|website=Deadline Hollywood|date=September 24, 2017|access-date=September 24, 2017}}</ref> while PostTrak reported filmgoers gave the film an overall positive score of 74%.

Accolades

 See also 
 When Billie Beat Bobby''

References

External links 
 
 

Billie Jean King
2017 films
2010s sports comedy-drama films
American LGBT-related films
American sports comedy-drama films
Cultural depictions of tennis players
Cultural depictions of American women
Cultural depictions of American men
2010s feminist films
British sports comedy-drama films
British LGBT-related films
Films about sexism
Films directed by Jonathan Dayton and Valerie Faris
Films set in 1973
Films set in California
Films set in Houston
Fox Searchlight Pictures films
Lesbian-related films
Films with screenplays by Simon Beaufoy
Sports films based on actual events
Tennis films
2017 LGBT-related films
American feminist comedy films
British feminist films
Films scored by Nicholas Britell
LGBT-related films based on actual events
2010s English-language films
2010s American films
2010s British films
Biographical films about LGBT people